Briana Marela Lizárraga is an American musician. Previously from Seattle, Marela is now based in Oakland, California.

Biography
Marela grew up in Seattle and studied music technology while attending college in Olympia, Washington. She independently released two albums before signing with Jagjaguwar Records, who issued All Around Us in 2015. Alex Somers produced the album.

Her fourth album, Call It Love, was released in August 2017. Following the release of this album, Marela was dropped by Jagjaguwar, and she took time off from active performance as a solo artist while a student in the MFA program at Mills College. In April 2020, Marela's father, who lived in Peru, died, and due to the effects of the COVID-19 pandemic, she was unable to visit his home country for more than a year; these experiences influenced the content of her fifth album, You Are a Wave, which was released in September 2022.

Discography
Water Ocean Lake (2010)
Speak From Your Heart (2012)
All Around Us (Jagjaguwar, 2015)
Call It Love (Jagjaguwar, 2017)
You Are a Wave (Self-released, 2022)

References

American women singers
American indie rock musicians
Musicians from Seattle
Singers from Washington (state)
Living people
Year of birth missing (living people)
21st-century American women